Lord George Augustus Cavendish    ( – 2 May 1794) was a British nobleman, politician, and a member of the House of Cavendish.

Cavendish was born in London, the second son of William Cavendish, 3rd Duke of Devonshire and his wife, the former Catherine Hoskins. King George II was his godfather. He was educated in Chesterfield and at St John's College, Cambridge.

In 1753, he inherited Holker Hall (then in Lancashire) from his maternal cousin Sir William Lowther, 3rd Baronet. He replanted the park there, and added a number of unusual trees, including Lebanese cedar trees sent to him as seeds from a friend in Lebanon.

He entered Parliament in 1751 for Weymouth and Melcombe Regis, and in 1754, took up the family seat of Derbyshire, which he occupied, with one interruption, until his death forty years later. He served as Comptroller of the Household from 1761 to 1762, and was named to the Privy Council in 1762. He served as Lord Lieutenant of Derbyshire from 1766 to 1782.

Cavendish died suddenly in May 1794 while returning to London from Holker Hall. On his death, Holker passed in turn to his younger brothers.

References

1727 births
1794 deaths
Alumni of St John's College, Cambridge
Younger sons of dukes
George Cavendish, Lord
Members of the Parliament of Great Britain for Weymouth and Melcombe Regis
Members of the Parliament of Great Britain for Derbyshire
British MPs 1747–1754
British MPs 1754–1761
British MPs 1761–1768
British MPs 1768–1774
British MPs 1774–1780
British MPs 1780–1784
British MPs 1784–1790
British MPs 1790–1796
Members of the Privy Council of Great Britain
Lord-Lieutenants of Derbyshire